Miller County Courthouse may refer to:

Miller County Courthouse (Arkansas), Texarkana, Arkansas
Miller County Courthouse (Georgia), Colquitt, Georgia